BCL2-like 13 (apoptosis facilitator), also known as BCL2L13 or Bcl-rambo, is a protein which in humans is encoded by the BCL2L13 gene on chromosome 22. This gene encodes a mitochondrially-localized protein which is classified under the Bcl-2 protein family. Overexpression of the encoded protein results in apoptosis. As a result, it has been implicated in cancers such as childhood acute lymphoblastic leukemia (ALL) and glioblastoma multiforme (GBM). Alternatively spliced transcript variants have been observed for this gene, such as Bcl-rambo beta.

Structure 

As a member of the Bcl-2 protein family, Bcl-rambo comprises four conserved BH domains and a transmembrane (TM) domain. However, unlike the other members, Bcl-rambo does not require the BH domains for its apoptotic function, relying instead on the mitochondrial localization carried out by the TM domain. In addition to these domains, it has conserved B-cell lymphoma 2 homology motifs, as well as an extension at its c-terminal, termed the BHNo domain, which contains two tandem repeats, RTA and RTB.

An alternatively-spliced protein variant, called Bcl-rambo beta, is composed of only the BH4 domain, completely lacking the BH domains 1 through 3 due to an in-frame stop codon inserted by an Alu element. Without the TM domain, this variant remains in the cytosol and does not localize to the mitochondria. Nonetheless, it still performs proapoptotic activity, mediated by the encoded Alu element, though the exact mechanisms remain to be elucidated.

Function 

Bcl-rambo is a member of the Bcl-2 family of proteins that regulate apoptosis. In cells, Bcl-rambo is localized to the mitochondria, and its overexpression induces apoptosis that is blocked by caspase inhibitors, whereas inhibitors controlling upstream events of either the 'death receptor' (FLIP, FADD-DN) or the 'mitochondrial' pro-apoptotic pathway (Bcl-x(L)) had no effect. Bcl-rambo mediates apoptosis by associating with adenine nucleotide translocator (ANT), a component of the mitochondrial permeability transition pore, to induce its opening. ANT will also facilitate the transfer of ADP and ATP between the cytosol and the matrix.

Clinical significance 

The BCL2L13 gene has been implicated in a wide spectrum of cancers. Previous clinical studies observed in ALL patients that high expression of BCL2L13 correlated to lower event-free and overall survival. Though statistically significant, the observations contradict the accepted pro-apoptotic function of BCL2L13’s gene product, which should have contributed to cancer cell death and, thus, more favorable survival outcomes. Two possible explanations propose that either 1) Bcl-rambo performs a different biological role in childhood, or 2) alternative splicing could have generated an anti-apoptotic variant. More research is necessary to resolve this discrepancy. In another type of cancer, GBM, Bcl-rambo is known to inhibit induced apoptosis in GBM cells by binding two other pro-apoptotic proteins, ceramide synthases 2 (CerS2) and 6 (CerS6), thereby blocking CerS2/6 complex formation and activity. Thus, inhibiting BCL2L13 during cancer treatments may improve survival outcomes.

Interactions 

BCL2L13 has been shown to interact with:
CerS2 and
CerS6.

References

External links

Further reading 

 
 
 
 
 
 
 

Proteins
Genes